Goosebumps is a children's anthology horror television series based on R. L. Stine's best-selling book series of the same name. It originally aired on the Fox Kids Network from 1995 to 1998.

All together, 43 of the original 62 books were adapted, along with nine stories from the Tales to Give You Goosebumps series, and two books from Goosebumps Series 2000. The Chillogy three-parter was a completely original story, while the episode More Monster Blood was an original story based on existing characters. Brad MacDonald composed the underscore to 42 Goosebumps episodes.

Series overview

Episodes

Season 1 (1995–96)

Season 2 (1996–97)

Season 3 (1997–98)

Season 4 (1998)

See also

List of Goosebumps books

References

External links
 at Scholastic Press

Episodes
Lists of American children's television series episodes
Lists of Canadian children's television series episodes
Lists of American science fiction television series episodes
Rapid human age change in fiction

ja:ミステリー・グースバンプス#各話リスト